Toneatto is an Italian surname. Notable people with the surname include:

Lauro Toneatto (1933–2010), Italian footballer and coach
Tony Toneatto, Canadian psychologist

See also
Tonetto

Italian-language surnames